Nade or Nadé may refer to:

People
 Christian Nadé (born 1984), French professional footballer
 Mickaël Nadé (born 1999), French professional footballer
 Raphaël Nadé (born 1980), Ivorian professional footballer
 Nade Dieu (born ), Belgian actress
 Nade Haley (1947–2016), American visual artist
 Nadeshot (born 1992), American esports player and founder of 100 Thieves

See also
 Grenade, sometimes called a 'nade' for short